Karim Fegrouche (born 14 February 1982) is a Moroccan former football goalkeeper.

Club career

PAS Giannina
In 2011, he signed for PAS Giannina, helping the team to stay in the Greek Superleague. The 2012–13 season started very well for Fegrouche – on 21 October 2012 he saved a penalty from Marama Vahirua against Panthrakikos and on 3 December he saved another penalty from Roger Guerreiro against AEK Athens.

AEL Limassol
In 2013, he signed for AEL Limassol, to replace Matías Degra

Fegrouche played in Sweden for IK Sirius from 2016 to 2018, only getting league appearances in 2018. He retired after that, but in the summer of 2021 he made a comeback on the Sirius bench against Djurgården.

International career
Fegrouche made his debut for the Morocco national football team in a friendly match against Benin on 20 August 2008.

References

External links 
 
 youtube.com

Living people
1982 births
Association football goalkeepers
Moroccan footballers
Morocco international footballers
Wydad AC players
PAS Giannina F.C. players
AEL Limassol players
AS FAR (football) players
IK Sirius Fotboll players
Allsvenskan players
Super League Greece players
Cypriot First Division players
Moroccan expatriate footballers
Expatriate footballers in Greece
Moroccan expatriate sportspeople in Greece
Expatriate footballers in Cyprus
Moroccan expatriate sportspeople in Cyprus
Expatriate footballers in Sweden
Moroccan expatriate sportspeople in Sweden
People from Fez, Morocco